Thermal time may refer to:
Thermal time scale,  an astrophysical measure
Thermal time hypothesis,  the idea in physics that time is emergent
Thermal death time